Verkhneye Inkho is a rural locality (a selo) in Gumbetovsky District, Republic of Dagestan, Russia. The population was 1,030 as of 2010. There are 6 streets.

Geography 
Verkhneye Inkho is located 33 km south of Mekhelta (the district's administrative centre) by road. Nizhneye Inkho and Chitl are the nearest rural localities.

References 

Rural localities in Gumbetovsky District